The Nature Conservation Council was a New Zealand government agency that existed from 1962 to 1990.

It was set up largely in response to the increasing opposition to a hydro-electricity scheme that was being planned at that stage for Lake Manapouri.

See also
Conservation Council (disambiguation)

References
The Nature Conservation Council, 1975. Government Printer, Wellington.

Nature conservation organisations based in New Zealand